Salem Junction railway station (station code:  SA) is an A1 category ISO 14001 certified junction railway station situated in the city of Salem in the state of Tamil Nadu, India. Salem Railway Junction has been rated as the cleanest station among the divisional headquarters railway stations and also the ninth cleanest railway station in the entire country, according to a survey report published in June 2017. It is one of the major transit points in Southern India.

Administration
The station is the headquarters of the Salem railway division of the Southern Railway zone in the Indian state of Tamil Nadu. It is one of the major transit points in Southern India.

History 

The station came into existence as part of the Chennai (then Madras)–Beypore (present-day Kerala) rail line in the 1860s. The station gained its junction status when the metre-gauge line was laid to Vridachalam, providing a connection to the South Indian railway network. After independence, the abandoned narrow-gauge line of Dharmapuri–Morappur was re-built and alignment changed to terminate the line at Salem Junction instead of Morappur. It was upgraded to metre gauge simultaneously. Salem to Bangalore via Hosur 124-mile-long railway line survey was sanctioned on 25 July 1955 and field work started on 27 February 1956. In the 1990s, this railway line was converted to broad gauge. In the 2000s, the Vriddachalam line was also converted to broad gauge, making the station a complete broad-gauge station. The long-pending new broad-gauge railway line to Karur, started in the late 1990s, was commissioned in 2013. This paved way for a shorter, more direct route to southern districts of Tamil Nadu from Salem.

Connectivity and infrastructure 
Salem Junction has 24-hour continuous (Bus No:13) bus service to Town Bus Station (Old Bus Stand) and Central Bus Stand (New Bus Stand). There are originating passenger trains in all junction lines.
It is an upgraded A–grade station. The station has a subway for every platform and platform bridges with escalators. The station has six platforms and eight tracks.

Facilities 

The AC Waiting Hall at 1st, 3rd, and 4th Platforms with toilet facilities cost Rs:20/hr. The second entrance with ticket counter at Old Suramangalam Road is planning to construct with subway and footover. Platforms 1, 3 and 4 are operated with 24-hour lifts and escalators.

It has IRCTC Railway Canteen Platform No:3&4. Anandha Bhavan and Ashok Bhavan are nearby restaurants, and Hotel Ashwa Park, Raddison, Sivaraj Holiday Inn, and CJ Plazzio are nearby hotels.

The Salem Railway Division introduced battery operated car service on a payment basis at the Salem Railway Junction, available on platform numbers 3 and 4. The service is meant mainly for senior citizens, differently abled people, and ailing persons.

On 26 December 2017, Salem Junction got free Wi-Fi connectivity. The facility is being provided by RailTel, a public sector telecom infrastructure provider.

Lines 

There are six lines branching out from the station:
 Double Electrified BG line towards 
 Double Electrified BG line towards 
 Double Electrified BG line towards 
 Single electric BG line towards  
 Single electric BG line towards  via Dharmapuri junction (doubling is under process)
 Single Electrified BG line towards (doubling and electrification Proposed)

References

Railway junction stations in Tamil Nadu
Railway stations in Salem district
Transport in Salem, Tamil Nadu
Salem railway division